Vazhkai Vazhvatharke is a 1964 Indian Tamil-language romance film directed by Krishnan–Panju from a story by Kothamangalam Subbu. The film stars Gemini Ganesan and B. Saroja Devi. It was released on 7 February 1964.

Plot 

Cousins Kandan and Valli have been lovers since childhood. As a boy, Kandan leaves the home of Valli after being insulted and ridiculed by her mother as good-for-nothing and as the offspring of mother whose fidelity has been questioned by her husband. Picked up by a race horse owner, Kandan grows up into a jockey and when he becomes rich, he goes to Valli's home to claim her in marriage. He is again rebuffed and, after several moments of anguish, he clears up the stigma attached to his mother and, when all doubts and misunderstandings are cleared, he re-unites with Valli. With the re-union of the family members, his sister also finds a solution to the problem of her marriage with her lover, a zamindar.

Cast 
Male cast
 Gemini Ganesan as Kandan
 K. A. Thangavelu as the robber and the zamindar
 S. A. Ashokan
 T. S. Muthaiah

Female cast
 B. Saroja Devi as Valli
 M. V. Rajamma
Sundari Bai
G. Sakunthala
Sarada
K. Malathi
Baby Padmini

Production 
Vazhkai Vazhvatharke was directed by Krishnan–Panju (a duo consisting of R. Krishnan and S. Panju) and produced by Kamaludheen under the banner Kamal Brothers. The story was written by Kothamangalam Subbu and the dialogue by Murasoli Maran. Cinematography was handled by S. Maruti Rao, and the art direction by A. K. Sekhar.

Soundtrack 
The music of the film was composed by Viswanathan–Ramamoorthy (a duo consisting of M. S. Viswanathan and T. K. Ramamoorthy) while the lyrics were written by Kannadasan.

Release and reception 
Vazhkai Vazhvatharke was released on 7 February 1964. On the same day, The Indian Express described the story as lacking "life" and the direction as "amateurish", concluding, "The producers, perhaps, want us to believe that this is life and it is worth living." On 21 March 1964, T. M. Ramachandran of Sport and Pastime dismissed the film as a potboiler, but praised the performances of Ganesan and Saroja Devi, while describing Thangavelu, in his dual role performance, as "the real life and soul of the picture". Kanthan of Kalki panned the film, criticising virtually every aspect including the story, songs, characters and the confusing screenplay.

References

External links 
 

1960s romance films
1960s Tamil-language films
Films directed by Krishnan–Panju
Films scored by Viswanathan–Ramamoorthy
Indian romance films